M294 or M-294 may refer to:
 a mutation of the haplogroup CT of Y-DNA in human genetics
 M-294 (Michigan highway),  a state trunkline highway in Calhoun County in the United States of America
 the Public School number for Essex Street Academy (Seward Park campus) in the list of high schools in New York City – Manhattan
 the fiscal code for Bellizzi, a town and comune in the province of Salerno in the Campania region of south-western Italy
 the former Kriegsmarine code for M190 Seepferd (1956–1966), an ocean minesweeper of type 319 in the list of German Federal Navy ships